William Dumas (born 23 January 1942 in Nîmes) was a member of the National Assembly of France from 2004 to 2017.  He represented the 5th constituency of the Gard department,  and is a member of the Socialiste, radical, citoyen et divers gauche.

References

1942 births
Living people
People from Nîmes
Socialist Party (France) politicians
Deputies of the 13th National Assembly of the French Fifth Republic
Deputies of the 14th National Assembly of the French Fifth Republic